Ralph Eugene (Peppy) Blount (born October 19, 1924, Ferris, Texas - d. June 22, 2010) was an American collegiate football end, member of the Texas house of representatives and a former World War II pilot of a B-25J who authored several books about life, war and football.  In 1945, just before the end of World War II, First Lieutenant Blount participated in the attack of the Japanese cargo ship Kanju Maru at Saigon.  After the war, he returned to the University of Texas where he teamed with quarterback Bobby Layne, and was a member of Alpha Tau Omega.  He was the ninth-round draft choice of the Chicago Bears in 1948.  He never played professional football, but became an on-field official, and was a line judge in the American Football League in 1966 and 1967.  He later wrote several books, including We Band of Brothers; Mamas, Don't Let Your Babies Grow Up to Play Football; A Time For All Reasons; and All Things Considered... It's Been a Good Life.

Blount was a practicing attorney in Longview, Texas from 1956 till his retirement in February 2010 and was honored by the State Bar of Texas for his more than 50 years as an attorney.

Peppy died on June 22, 2010.

See also
 List of American Football League officials

References

1924 births
2010 deaths
American football tight ends
American Football League officials
Texas Longhorns football players
United States Army Air Forces officers
Members of the Texas Legislature
People from Howard County, Texas
People from Ferris, Texas
Players of American football from Texas
Texas lawyers
Writers from Texas
United States Army Air Forces bomber pilots of World War II
20th-century American lawyers
Military personnel from Texas